Beauford Township is a township in Blue Earth County, Minnesota, United States. The population was 442 as of the 2000 census.

Geography

Unincorporated community
 Beauford at

Major highway
  Minnesota State Highway 22

Lake
 Perch Lake (western three-quarters)

Adjacent townships
 Decoria Township (north)
 McPherson Township (northeast)
 Medo Township (east)
 Danville Township (southeast)
 Mapleton Township (south)
 Sterling Township (southwest)
 Lyra Township (west)
 Rapidan Township (northwest)

Cemeteries
The township includes the following cemeteries:  Beauford and Oak Hill.

Demographics
As of the census of 2000, the township had 442 people, 159 households, and 123 families. The population density was 12.4 people per square mile (4.8/km). There were 163 housing units at an average density of 4.6/sq mi (1.8/km). The township's racial makeup was 98.64% White, 0.68% Asian, 0.23% from other races, and 0.45% from two or more races. Hispanic or Latino of any race were 0.90% of the population.

There were 159 households, of which 36.5% had children under the age of 18 living with them, 67.3% were married couples living together, 5.7% had a female householder with no husband present, and 22.6% were non-families. 17.0% of all households were made up of individuals, and 9.4% had someone living alone who was 65 years of age or older. The average household size was 2.78 and the average family size was 3.15.

29.0% of the township's residents were under age 18, 7.5% were from age 18 to 24, 28.5% were from age 25 to 44, 20.1% were from age 45 to 64, and 14.9% were age 65 or older. The median age was 36 years. For every 100 females, there were 104.6 males. For every 100 females age 18 and over, there were 107.9 males.

The township's median household income was $43,542, and the median family income was $47,656. Males had a median income of $33,333 versus $27,500 for females. The township's per capita income was $18,029. About 4.7% of families and 5.5% of the population were below the poverty line, including 3.5% of those under age 18 and 10.7% of those age 65 or over.

References
 United States National Atlas
 United States Census Bureau 2007 TIGER/Line Shapefiles
 United States Board on Geographic Names (GNIS)

Townships in Blue Earth County, Minnesota
Mankato – North Mankato metropolitan area
Townships in Minnesota